Brian Eatwell (1 June 1939 – 20 January 2007) was a British art director. He designed the sets for a number of British and American films and television programmes.

Selected filmography
 The Shuttered Room (1967)
 Just Like a Woman (1967)
 Here We Go Round the Mulberry Bush (1968)
 The Strange Affair (1968)
 I Start Counting (1970)
 Secrets (1971)
 Walkabout (1971)
 The Three Musketeers (1973)
 The Four Musketeers (1974)
 The Man Who Fell to Earth (1976)
 The Last Remake of Beau Geste (1977)
 The Onion Field (1979)

References

Bibliography 
 Michael L. Stephens. Art Directors in Cinema: A Worldwide Biographical Dictionary. McFarland, 1998.

External links 
 
 Brian Eatwell at Find a Grave

1939 births
2007 deaths
British art directors
People from London
British emigrants to the United States
Burials at Hollywood Forever Cemetery